The 1972 Women's Olympic Volleyball Tournament was the 3rd edition of the event, organized by the world's governing body, the FIVB in conjunction with the IOC. It was held in Munich, West Germany from 27 August to 7 September 1972.

Qualification

* South Korea qualified as next best team as Japan is already qualified.

Format
The tournament was played in two different stages. A single round-robin format was played within each pool to determine the teams position in the pool. The  (second stage) was played in a single elimination format, where the preliminary round two highest ranked teams in each group advanced to the semifinals and the two lowest ranked teams advanced to the 5th–8th place semifinals.

Pools composition

Rosters

Venue
Volleyball Hall, Munich, West Germany

Preliminary round

Pool A

|}

Pool B

|}

Final round

5th–8th place

5th–8th place semifinals

|}

7th place match

|}

5th place match

|}

Final

Semifinals

|}

Bronze medal match

|}

Gold medal match

|}

Final standing

Medalists

References

External links
Final standings (1964–2000) at FIVB.org
Results at Todor66.com
Results at Sports123.com
Official results (pgs. 438-441, 450-454)

O
1972
Olympics
Women's volleyball in West Germany
Vol